Lambda Gruis, Latinized from λ Gruis, is a solitary, orange-hued star in the southern constellation of Grus. With an apparent visual magnitude of 4.47, it is visible to the naked eye as a faint point of light. The distance to this star, as determined using an annual parallax shift of 13.47 mas as seen from the Earth, is around 242 light years. It is drifting further away with a radial velocity of +39 km/s, having come to within  some 805,000 years ago.

This is an evolved K-type giant star with a stellar classification of K3 III, having exhausted the supply of hydrogen at its core then cooled and expanded off the main sequence. It has about 2.4 times the mass of the Sun and has expanded to 22.3 times the Sun's radius. The star is radiating 155 times the Sun's luminosity from its photosphere at an effective temperature of 4,269 K.

References

K-type giants
Grus (constellation)
Gruis, Lambda
Durchmusterung objects
209688
109111
8411